Rupert Charles Wulsten Bunny (29 September 186425 May 1947) was an Australian painter. Born and raised in Melbourne, Victoria, he achieved success and critical acclaim as an expatriate in fin-de-siècle Paris. He gained an honourable mention at the Paris Salon of 1890 with his painting Tritons and a bronze medal at the Paris Exposition Universelle in 1900 with his Burial of St Catherine of Alexandria. The French state acquired 13 of his works for the Musée du Luxembourg and regional collections. He was a "sumptuous colourist and splendidly erudite painter of ideal themes, and the creator of the most ambitious Salon paintings produced by an Australian."

Early life and education 
Bunny was the third son of Brice Frederick Bunny, a British Victorian county court judge, and his German mother, Marie Hedwig Dorothea Wulsten. He was born in St Kilda, Melbourne. He had an affluent and privileged upbringing.

During his childhood, Bunny had an extended trip in Europe, which lasted two years. He returned to Australia trilingual, in English, French and German.

In early 1881, Bunny was enrolled into the University of Melbourne, intending to study civil engineering. Instead, Bunny began his artistic training in 1881 to 1883 in Melbourne at the National Gallery School of Design under O.R. Campbell and George Folingsby. He studied alongside artists such as Fred McCubbin, Aby Altson and John Longstaff. In 1884, at age 20, he moved to London to continue his artistic education. He studied under Phillip Calderon at St Johns Wood Art School for 18 months. Upon meeting the French academic history painter Jean-Paul Laurens in London, Bunny enrolled in Laurens' atelier in Paris, where he studied for 2 years until 1886. Finishing his artistic training, he studied under Pierre Paul Léon Glaize at the Académie Colarossi in 1890.

Critics give responsibility to his cosmopolitan childhood for his ability to assimilate easily into Parisian society and its artistic circles, unlike many other expatriates. He was well respected in Paris, where he remained until 1932.

Career 
Bunny had a traditional and academic education in the arts under Calderon and Laurens. Despite this, Bunny's artistic practice was heavily influenced by, and imitated, his contemporaries. Whilst he was not an avant gardist, Bunny was a modern artist. His early works, before the turn of the century, are described as 'neo-classical style touched with Pre-Raphaelitism' or as symbolist. Mythology, both Christian and classical, provided the subjects for these paintings, seen in the paintings Tritons (circa 1890) and The Descent From the Cross (circa 1898). The paintings showed an amalgamation of his traditional training, through the technicality, with the more experimental style of the Europeans at the time, seen in the sensibility.

Meeting his wife, Jeanne Heloise Morel, in 1895, his style shifted to a Pre-Raphaelite depiction of romantic, indolent female figures. Morel was continually depicted in these paintings, and has been referred to as Bunny's "eternal muse", such as in the works Returning from the garden (1906) and Jeanne (1902). These depictions of angelic women suggested the influence of British Pre-Raphaelites John Everett Millais and Dante Gabriel Rossetti.

In 1901 he left the Salon de la Société des Artistes Français for the Société Nationale des Beaux-Arts. This saw a change in Bunny's style. With growing critical and financial success, Bunny began exploring modernity in his works such as In the Luxembourg Gardens (circa 1909). The leisure and languor of the belle-epoque pervaded his paintings, which almost exclusively depicted beautiful women. Bunny married Morel in 1902, and, in both style and sensibility, his works became distinctively more French.

Continually adjusting his oeuvre to reflect the changing styles seen in Europe, especially Paris during the early 20th century, Bunny's artistic style changed again. As art critic John McDonald stated, "He was not a painter of timeless masterpieces, but a versatile professional, ever alert to the changing currents of art fashion." Particularly influenced by Matisse and Sergei Diaghilev's Ballets Russes, Bunny's works developed into compositions with "heightened colour and abstracted, rhythmical forms". This is seen in many works including Salomé (circa 1919), Bell Dance (circa 1920) and Fresque (circa 1921). His painting The Rape of Persephone (circa 1913) was described by artist and critic George Bell as "a glorious riot of colour from the finest imaginative Australia has produced". Towards the 1920s, Bunny revisited mythology as his subject, this time in a modernist style.

In the late 1920s, Bunny painted many landscapes, including Waterfront, Bandol (1929) and Cemetery, South of France (1920s).

Music was a significant influence over Bunny's art. His mother was a "talented" piano player, and friend of Clara Schumann and Bunny has been described as an "exceptional" piano player himself. In his career, he painted many portraits of notable musicians, including Nellie Melba, Percy Grainger and Ada Crossley. He also produced works such as Nocturne [The Distant Song] (circa 1908), The Sonata (circa 1910), and Moonlight Sonata (circa 1907), with obvious allusions to music.

Bunny's art continually spoke to a cosmopolitan, cultured audience. His subject matter which portrays mythology, musical and literary allusions and modern dance are suited to "a leisured class of viewers". This was a meditated choice, and is evidence of Bunny's understanding of the market his artworks targeted, namely the middle and upper classes.

Like many artists living and working in Paris during the early 20th century, Bunny had an interest in the Orient. He painted a portrait of Japanese actress Madame Sadayakko, titled Madame Sada Yakko as Kesa (circa 1900), which depicted the actress in character from Kesa, an adaptation of a Kabuki play entitled Endo Musha. The portrait was praised by Le Figaro's critic for its accurate tone. "By employing a lexicon of orientalism and Japonisme, Bunny tapped into a timeless, borderless belle époque mood".

Later life 

In 1895, Bunny met his wife Jeanne Morel, a fellow art student, who he married in 1902, at age 38. Deborah Edwards states that Bunny was a homosexual, however, as she explicates, "the fin de siecle's two most famous homosexual men, Oscar Wilde and Marcel Proust, demonstrated liaisons with and love of women do not exclude homosexuality." The happiness of his relationship with his wife is unknown. "Some say it was terrible, others are highly romantic."

Bunny led a cosmopolitan lifestyle in Paris, mixing with artists and musicians such as Claude Debussy, Auguste Rodin, Nellie Melba, and Sarah Bernhardt. Sharing his studio with Alastair Cary-Elwes, the grandson of an English baronet, Bunny was continually networking. Whilst still studying under Laurens, Bunny continually attended his teacher's open studios, which allowed him to meet many 'high-society figures'. Additionally, he attended the salons of the well connected artist Jacques-Émile Blanche, Emmi de Némethy and her grandmother the Countess Schärffenberg, the Hungarian poet József Kiss' wife and Madame Ayem, a collector of Gustave Moreau. Thus, Bunny was well connected and supported in Paris. In 1911, Bunny visited Australia with his wife. For many years afterwards, Bunny travelled back and forth between Australia and France. Morel died in 1933. Following almost 50 years living overseas, Bunny moved back to Australia permanently in 1933. He lived on Toorak Road in South Yarra, Victoria. The Depression, his own economic hardship and his wife's death were factors in his relocation to Australia.

Bunny assimilated into the art scene in Melbourne easily, and continued to show his work. This included an annual exhibition in the Macquarie Gallery. He rejected Robert Menzies' invitation to join the Australian Academy of Art in 1939. Instead he became the Vice President of the Contemporary Art Society established in 1939 in Melbourne.

Bunny died in a private hospital on 25 May 1947, at age 82.

Accolades and achievements 
Deborah Edwards, curator of Rupert Bunny: Artist in Paris, said Bunny is "unquestionably the most successful artist we (Australia) had in Paris". He regularly exhibited works in Parisian salons. Incomparable to other expatriates, he had a deep intimacy and familiarity with the Parisian art scene. As Australian art critic John McDonald stated, "It is no exaggeration to say that Bunny had the greatest international reputation of any Australian-born painter". He began exhibiting works in the Salon de la Société des Artistes Français in 1888. Bunny also exhibited in the New Salon, the Old Salon and the Salon D'Automne. He was the first Australian to receive an honourable mention in 1890 at the Salon de la Société des Artistes Français for the painting Tritons (circa 1890). He also exhibited works internationally, including in Australia, America and England. Sea Idlyll, exhibited in the Royal Academy, was bought by Alfred Felton, who gave it to the National Gallery of Victoria in 1892. This was to be the first painting of Bunny's that an Australian gallery obtained. 

In 1894 Bunny became a member of the Royal Society of British Artists. Engaging in many 'transnational' relationships with other expatriates and cosmopolitans, Bunny extensively networked, particularly with Americans, who formed the majority of expatriates in Paris. Thus, in 1900, he became a member of the American Art Association of Paris. He also frequented the American Club. Also in 1900, his work Burial of St Catherine of Alexandria was awarded a bronze medal in the Exposition Universelle, Paris. In 1901, Bunny exhibited two paintings in the Victorian Gold Jubilee Exhibition 1851–1901 in Bendigo, in which he was awarded the gold medal for Best Painting. In 1904 the French government bought his work titled Aprés le Bain from the New Salon exhibition for the Musee de Luxembourg, Paris. He was the first Australian artist to have works acquired by the French government. Throughout his career, the government acquired 13 of his works, the most acquired from a foreign artist living in Paris by the government. This included Endormies (circa 1904), now exhibited in the National Gallery of Victoria, Summertime (circa 1907) and A Summer Morning (circa 1908), both now exhibited in the Art Gallery of New South Wales.

In 1905 he became a membre associe of the Société Nationale des Beaux-Arts. In 1906, the French government purchased its second painting, Endormies. In 1910, he was on the jury of the Salon d'Automne, which accepted Matisse's Danse and Musique. Major art critic Gustave Geffroy was a 'prestigious critical admirer' of Bunny's work. In 1939 he became Artist Vice President of the Contemporary Art Society in Melbourne. The National Gallery of Victoria held a retrospective exhibition of Bunny's works, curated by Mary Eagle, which was the first exhibition to honour a living artist in this way. Since his death, there have been several major retrospectives of Bunny's work including Rupert Bunny: Artist in Paris, curated by Deborah Edwards, which travelled from the Art Gallery of New South Wales to many galleries including the National Gallery of Victoria and the Art Gallery of South Australia in 2010. It showed over 100 of Bunny's works, including monotypes, paintings and drawings. Some of which had never been exhibited in Australia before. Rupert Bunny: Last Fine Days, A focus exhibition was curated to complement Edwards’ Rupert Bunny: Artist in Paris in the regional Newcastle Art Gallery.

Exhibitions

Source:

Gallery

References

External links

  (includes a 1920 self-portrait)
 Rupert Bunny at the Art Gallery of New South Wales
 Biography at Philip Bacon Galleries
 Short biography and some pictures at Eva Breuer gallery
 Artcyclopedia
 "Rupert Bunny: what lies beneath?" by Christopher Allen, The Australian, 12 December 2009

1864 births
1947 deaths
Artists from Melbourne
Australian expatriates in France
19th-century Australian painters
19th-century Australian male artists
20th-century Australian painters
20th-century Australian male artists
Symbolist painters
Australian male painters
People from St Kilda, Victoria
Australian people of English descent
National Gallery of Victoria Art School alumni